Ladislav Šimůnek (4 October 1916 – 7 December 1969) was a Czech football player.

He was a devoted player of SK Slavia Praha.

He played for the Czechoslovakia national team (4 matches/3 goals) and was a participant at the 1938 FIFA World Cup, where he played two games.

References 
 

1916 births
1969 deaths
Czech footballers
Czechoslovak footballers
1938 FIFA World Cup players
SK Slavia Prague players
Czechoslovakia international footballers
Association football forwards